Protogryllidae is an extinct family of crickets in the order Orthoptera. There are about 8 genera and more than 20 described species in Protogryllidae.

Genera
These eight genera belong to the family Protogryllidae:
 † Aenigmagryllus Gorochov, 1992
 † Angarogryllus Gorochov, 1985
 † Asiogryllus Gorochov, 1985
 † Bacharogryllus Gorochov, 1984
 † Falsispeculum Gorochov, 1985
 † Karataogryllus Sharov, 1968
 † Parangarogryllus Gorochov, 1984
 † Protogryllus Handlirsch, 1906

References

Crickets
Prehistoric insect families